Mudassar Hussain Kapur (born 14 December 1976) is a Norwegian politician. He is a member of the Conservative Party and has served as a member of the Storting for Oslo since 2013.

Education 
Kapur studied marketing, branding and management at the BI Norwegian Business School from 1995 to 2000 and earned an MBA in strategic management from the Norwegian School of Economics in 2012.

Career 
Kapur began his career in sales and marketing for Royal Dutch Shell in 2000. In 2006, he transitioned into politics as a campaign manager for the Conservative Party where he worked until 2012. The same year, he became a fundraiser for SOS Children's Villages.

Local politics 
He was elected to Oslo city council from the Søndre Nordstrand district in 2011 and served on the Finance Committee. In the 2013 Norwegian parliamentary election he was nominated in the 5th spot on the Conservative Party's ballot and gained a seat in the parliament in the election.

Parliament 
Kapur was elected to the Storting in the 2013 election and was re-elected in 2017 and 2021. 

In the Storting, Kapur served as a member of the Standing Committee on Local Government and Public Administration from 2013 to 2017.

After Henrik Asheim was appointed to the Solberg cabinet, Kapur succeeded him as chair of the Standing Committee on Finance and Economic Affairs. He held this post from February 2020 to September 2021, and was succeeded by Eigil Knutsen.

Personal life 
Kapur was born on 14 December 1976 in Oslo. He is of Pakistani descent, his family having immigrated to Norway from Pakistan in 1971, and he was born five years later. 

He is married and has a son and a daughter. The family lives in Ekeberg, Oslo.

References 

1976 births
Living people
Conservative Party (Norway) politicians
Members of the Storting
Politicians from Oslo
Norwegian people of Pakistani descent
21st-century Norwegian politicians